Shahin Khaledan (born 7 June 1990) is an Iranian tennis player.

Khaledan has a career high ATP singles ranking of 912 achieved on 22 October 2012. He also has a career high ATP doubles ranking of 1114 achieved on 5 December 2011.

Khaledan represents Iran at the Davis Cup where he has a W/L record of 20–13.

External links

1990 births
Living people
Iranian male tennis players
Sportspeople from Isfahan
Tennis players at the 2018 Asian Games
Asian Games competitors for Iran